Catherine of Brunswick-Wolfenbüttel (1518, in Wolfenbüttel – 16 May 1574, in Crossen) was a Princess of Brunswick-Wolfenbüttel by birth and by marriage Margravine of Brandenburg-Küstrin.

Life 
Catherine was a daughter of the Duke Henry V of Brunswick-Lüneburg (1489–1568) from his first marriage to Maria of Württemberg (1496–1541), daughter of Count Henry of Württemberg.

She married on 11 November 1537 in Wolfenbüttel Margrave John of Brandenburg-Küstrin (1513–1571).  Catherine was instrumental in the spread of the Reformation in the Margraviate of Brandenburg.

Catherine was considered extremely frugal and thrifty, and she actively supported her husband.  She had several outbuildings in Küstrin and a kitchen garden.  She had so-called "wild garden" in a suburb of Küstrin and other goods in Schaumburg, Drew and her favorite seat Dębno, a gift from her husband.  Catherine settled Dutch religious refugees in Dębno, which started a vibrant cloth-making industry.  She built a school and a church and in 1562, Dębno was granted a city charter.

Catherine, who was described as very popular, was known by the population as Mother Kate.  She founded the first pharmacy in Ośno Lubuskie and built another in Küstrin from which she provided the poor with free medicine.  Catherine built numerous farms and dairies, which she administered herself and she also sold the harvest herself.

Catherine died in 1574.  Her grave was discovered in 1999 in the ruins of the parish church in Küstrin by archaeologists from Szczecin.

The  ("Catherine Street") in Berlin-Halensee is named after her.

Issue 
From her marriage to John, Catherine had two daughters:
 Elisabeth (1540–1578)
 married in 1558 George Frederick I, Margrave of Brandenburg-Ansbach (1539–1603)
 Catherine (1549–1602)
 married in 1570 Joachim Frederick, Elector of Brandenburg (1546–1608)

References 
 K. W. Kutschbach: Chronik der Stadt Küstrin, Enslin, 1849, p. 45 ff
 Ernst Helwing: Geschichte des brandenburgischen Staats, 1834, p. 648 digitized

Footnotes 

Catherine
Margravines of Germany
1518 births
1574 deaths
Converts to Lutheranism from Roman Catholicism
Daughters of monarchs